Erik Rutan (born June 10, 1971) is an American heavy metal musician and producer from New Jersey.  He is the guitarist and lead vocalist of death metal band Hate Eternal and lead guitarist for Cannibal Corpse, who he fully joined in 2021 after acting as a fill-in guitarist during their 2019 tour. Rutan has also spent time with Morbid Angel (three different stints) and Ripping Corpse.  When not performing, Rutan operates his own recording studio in Florida called Mana Recording Studios.

Recording
Rutan started his metal career with Ripping Corpse, recording one album titled Dreaming with the Dead released in 1991. Around 1995, he left to join Morbid Angel, recording Domination (1995) before leaving in 1996 to found his own band, Hate Eternal, releasing their first album Conquering the Throne in 1999. Rutan then returned to Morbid Angel to record Gateways to Annihilation, released in 2000. Rutan left Morbid Angel again to concentrate on Hate Eternal, releasing King of All Kings in 2002 and I, Monarch in 2005. He rejoined Morbid Angel once more for the band's 2006 summer tour of Europe, a move about which the other band members said, "This will certainly be an exciting event with the Domination lineup together for the first time in 10 years!" The tour included a stop at the Wacken Open Air festival.

Rutan has had a number of side projects that highlight different aspects of his playing. For example, he formed the group Alas with former the Therion vocalist Martina Astner, releasing the landmark progressive metal album Absolute Purity in 2001.

Rutan is a guest vocalist on the track "Bone Crown" on Annotations of an Autopsy's second full-length album, II: The Reign of Darkness.

On January 18, 2019, it was announced that Rutan would fill in for Pat O'Brien of Cannibal Corpse for the remainder of their winter and spring tour dates. Rutan was officially announced as a permanent member of the band on February 2, 2021 and appears on their fifteenth studio album Violence Unimagined.

Erik is a long time player of B.C. Rich guitars and has played various Ironbirds and V's with Dimarzio, EMG, Seymour Duncan, and (more recently) Fishman pickups. He has also played Ibanez guitars, mostly during his latter days with Morbid Angel and the early Hate Eternal days. During his time with Ripping Corpse, he played a Yamaha superstrat guitar (most likely an RGX model). For Morbid Angel, he used a Gibson Explorer outfitted with a Floyd Rose bridge and an Ibanez Universe guitar given to him by Trey Azagthoth. Recently, B.C. Rich created an Erik Rutan custom 7-string Ironbird with Fishman Fluence pickups and this is now his main guitar for Cannibal Corpse. Erik uses various amps from various companies including Marshall, ENGL, and Mesa Boogie.

In 2021 Rutan got an endorsement with B.C. Rich, he now has his own signature 7 String Ironbird.

Production

Rutan has produced the following albums:
 Belphegor: Conjuring the Dead
 Cannibal Corpse: Kill, Evisceration Plague, Torture, Red Before Black, Violence Unimagined
 Madball: Empire
 Agnostic Front: My Life My Way
 Six Feet Under: Commandment
 Annotations of an Autopsy: II: The Reign of Darkness
 Morbid Angel: Illud Divinum Insanus (drum production), Kingdoms Disdained
 Soilent Green: Inevitable Collapse in the Presence of Conviction, Confrontation
 Through the Eyes of the Dead: Malice
 Goatwhore: A Haunting Curse, Carving Out The Eyes of God, Blood for the Master, Constricting Rage of the Merciless
 Vital Remains: Icons of Evil
 Malevolent Creation: Invidious Dominion (co-producer)
 Nile: Those Whom the Gods Detest (drum production)
 Krisiun: Conquerors of Armageddon, Forged in Fury
 Pessimist: Slaughtering The Faithful
 Internal Suffering: Internal Suffering, Awakening of the Rebel
 Premonitions of War: Left In Kowloon
 Aeon: Path of Fire (mixing)
 In Battle: Welcome to the Battlefield
 The Absence: From Your Grave
 Pathology: Legacy of the Ancients
 Avulsed: Gorespattered Suicide
 Into The Moat: The Design, The Campaign (album)
 Torture Killer: Swarm! (mixing)
 Pain Principle: Waiting For The Flies
 Covenance: Ravaging The Pristine
 Ophiolatry: Anti-Evangelistic Process
 Devourment: Conceived in Sewage
 The Mountain Goats: All Eternals Deck (four songs)
 Masacre: Total Death
 Tombs: Savage Gold 
 Ephel Duath: Hemmed By Light, Shaped By Darkness, On Death and Cosmos
 Rivers of Nihil: The Conscious Seed of Light

References

External links

1971 births
Living people
21st-century American singers
21st-century American guitarists
21st-century American male singers
American heavy metal singers
American heavy metal guitarists
American male guitarists
Hate Eternal members
Lead guitarists
Morbid Angel members
Record producers from New Jersey
Singers from New Jersey